Vada is an unincorporated community in Decatur and Mitchell counties, in the U.S. state of Georgia.

History
A post office called Vada was established in 1892, and remained in operation until 1907. The community was named after Vada Wooten, the daughter of a local law enforcement agent. Early variant names were "Harrell" and "Pull-Tight".

References

Unincorporated communities in Georgia (U.S. state)
Unincorporated communities in Decatur County, Georgia
Unincorporated communities in Mitchell County, Georgia